William Howgill (1768/9–1824), was an English organist and composer.

Howgill was the son of William Howgill, organist at Whitehaven; he took his father's position after his death in 1790. Some years later, probably in 1810, he moved to London.

He published 32 pieces between 1791 and 1824, including  
'Four Voluntaries, part of the 3rd Chapter of the Wisdom of Solomon for three Voices, and six favourite Psalm Tunes, with an Accompaniment for the Organ,' London [1825?].
'Two Voluntaries for the Organ, with a Miserere and Gloria Tibi, Domine.'
'An Anthem and two Preludes for the Organ.'

His sister Ann Howgill (1775-?) was also an organist, holding positions at Staindrop and Penrith.

References

18th-century English people
1760s births
1824 deaths
18th-century English musicians
19th-century English musicians
English organists
British male organists
18th-century composers
18th-century British male musicians
19th-century British composers
English composers
18th-century keyboardists
19th-century British male musicians